Alaminos longganisa, also known as longganisa Pangasian, is a Filipino pork sausage originating from Alaminos, Pangasinan. It is a type of de recado longganisa. It is made with ground lean pork, ground pork fat, brown sugar, coarse salt, saltpeter, black pepper, vinegar, and garlic in hog casings. It is typically bright yellow or orange due to the use of achuete seeds. The segments of the sausage are uniquely divided by small pieces of coconut leaf midribs (sometimes mistaken for toothpicks). Each sausage string usually has six segments and is traditionally tied at the end with a length of buli palm fiber. The sausages are celebrated in an annual "Longganisa Festival" in Alaminos.

See also
 List of sausages

References

Philippine sausages